= Slobodanka Radović =

Croatian basketball player

Personal information
- Born: April 11, 1973 (age 53) Zagreb, SFR Yugoslavia
- Listed height: 1.88 m (6 ft 2 in)

Career information
- Playing career: –2005
- Position: Forward

Career history
- 2005: Sezana

Slobodanka Radović (born 11 April 1973 in Zagreb, SFR Yugoslavia) is a former Croatian female professional basketball player.
